The Hunter Group was South Africa's first special forces unit and counter-insurgency elite formed in 1968, with members of the unit forming and training later special forces and other specialised units of the South African Army.

History
Hunter Group was formed in May 1968 by Commandant G. van Kerckhoven of the South African Irish Regiment who saw a need to expand the counter-insurgency skills of certain members in the regiment and which would be superior to the basic skills  provided to the average national serviceman. He was aided by an ex-Rhodesian army weapons and unarmed combat expert named Grant-Grierson. Initially it drew members from the Irish regiment but as it reputation grew volunteers from other army units also joined. Members received 240 hours of training over weekends and at night over twelve months. 

Up to 700 men passed through the group's training with members forming or training the first special forces unit and 32 Battalion By 1976 the group had disbanded and its remaining members placed in Citizen Force (Reserve) unit 2 Reconnaissance Commando.

Training
Training included activities such as close weapons use, first aid, vehicle driving, parachuting, guerrilla warfare, stress and shock training, bushcraft and survival, demolitions and many other skills. Member of the group wore camouflaged uniforms which were not worn by any other South African unit with some in the style of airborne smocks with a silver scorpion insignia on a green background on their right sleeve.

References

Further reading 
 

1968 establishments in South Africa
1976 disestablishments in South Africa
Special forces of South Africa
Defunct organisations based in South Africa
Disbanded military units and formations in Johannesburg
Military units and formations of South Africa in the Border War
Military units and formations established in 1968
Military units and formations disestablished in 1976